The Sheriffs Act is an act passed by the Parliament of Ireland in 1293, during the reign of Edward I as Lord of Ireland.

The act covered the appointment of sheriffs and bailiffs; alienation without royal licence; enfeoffment; forbade the seneschal of a liberty from also being Justice Itinerant or of the Bench; addressed the collection of the "fifteenth" tax; and took back royal land that had been rented out for too low a sum; and provided that justice.

References

1290s in law
Acts of the Parliament of Ireland (pre-1801)
1293 in Europe
13th century in Ireland
1290s in Ireland